Annsborough is a small village in County Down which is one of the main residential areas in Castlewellan, Northern Ireland. It is situated on the A25 road between Downpatrick and Newry, about 0.8 kilometres to the east of Castlewellan and 17 kilometres to the south west of Downpatrick. It had a population of 593 in the 2001 Census. The village is situated within the Mourne Area of Outstanding Natural Beauty.

History 
Annsborough Primary School first opened in 1835, making it one of the oldest functional schools in the country. The school officially became integrated in 1997, after many years of unofficial integrated education.

Culture
The village is the home of the Annsborough Pipe Band. Currently competing in Grade 3A of the Royal Scottish Pipe Band Association, the band has won three World Championships in 2004, 2005 and 2015. Their Drum Corps were also crowned as World Champions in 2007 and 2015.

Demography
Annsborough is classified as a small village or hamlet by the Northern Ireland Statistics and Research Agency (NISRA) (i.e. with population of less than 1,000). On Census Day (29 April 2001) there were 593 people living in Annsborough. Of these:
29.4% were aged under 16 years and 13.6% were aged 60 and over
48.7% of the population were male and 51.3% were female
93.6% were from a Catholic background and 5.1% were from a Protestant background
5.8% of people aged 16–74 were unemployed

See also 
List of villages in Northern Ireland
List of towns in Northern Ireland

References

External links
Annsborough Mill

Villages in County Down